Fabien Danesi, a Doctor of Philosophy in Art History, is a lecturer at the Faculty of Arts of the University of Picardie Jules Verne in Amiens. Former resident of the Villa Medici, French Academy in Rome in 2007–2008, he previously taught at the François Rabelais University of Tours, Paris 13 University, Pantheon-Sorbonne University and the Versailles Saint-Quentin-en-Yvelines University. Member of AICA-France (Association Internationale des Critiques d'Art, in English International Association of Art Critics), he regularly collaborates with the Pavilion Neuflize OBC, laboratory creation which annually hosts ten young artists and curators recruited after an international competition from over 300 applications of the Palais de Tokyo.

Curating 

1 - The Fourth Dimension. Onomichi Museum City of Art, exposition November 22, 2014 - January 12, 2015. Exhibition of the residents of the Pavillon, research lab of Palais de Tokyo.

2 - The Night, Molecules and The Horizon. Exhibition at FRAC Corse, Corte, May 29, 2015 - October 30, 2015.

Catalog : La nuit, les molécules, l’horizon. Œuvres de la collection du FRAC Corse, Milan, Silvana Editoriale, 2015, 64 p.

3 - Hallucination(s). Exhibition at Ange Leccia Art Center, Oletta, July 14 - September 30, 2015.

4 - Urban Legends. Exhibition at Seoul Museum of Modern Art (SeMA), Seoul, April 5 - May 31, 2016.

5 - Off-side. Contemporary art and football. Ange Leccia Art Center, Oletta, July 30 - September 30, 2016.

6 - Prec(ar)ious Collectives. 23 Academia Street, Athens, April 2017. Exhibition of the residents of the Pavillon, research lab of Palais de Tokyo, parallel to Documenta 14.

7 - Playlist. Ange Leccia Art Center, Oletta, July - September 2017.

8 - The Dialectic of the Stars. Festival at Los Angeles February 11–25, 2018 in the context of FLAX Foundation (France Los Angeles Exchange).

9 - The Dialectic of the Stars. Extinction Dancefloor. Platform-L, Seoul, April 5 - June 30, 2018.

10 - Ana Vaz. The Voyage Out. Ange Leccia Art Center, Oletta, July–September 2018.

11 - I did an exhibition in my house nobody came. Private apartment, unknown address, Paris, October 18 - November 17, 2018.

12 - City Prince.sses Palais de Tokyo, Paris, June 21 - September 8, 2019, associate curator. Curator: Hugo Vitrani.

13 - Without voice. Ange Leccia Art Center, Oletta, July–September 2019.

14 - Our World is burning. Palais de Tokyo, Paris, February 21 - June 17, 2020, associate curator. Curator : Abdellah Karroum.

Bibliography 
 Le Cinéma de Guy Debord ou la négativité à l'oeuvre (1952-1994) (The cinema of Guy Debord or the negativity (1952-1994)), Paris, Paris expérimental, 2011
 With Fabrice Flahutez and Emmanuel Guy, La Fabrique du cinéma de Guy Debord, Paris, Actes Sud, 2013
 With Fabrice Flahutez and Emmanuel Guy, Undercover Guy Debord, Paris, Artvenir, 2012
 La nymphe et le phallus : sur Three Horizontals et l'angoisse suspendue (The nymph and the phallus: Three Horizontals and suspended anxiety), dans Fabien Danesi, Evelyne Grossman, Frédéric Vengeon, Louise Bourgeois "Three Horizontals, Paris, INHA/Collège International de Philosophie, éditions Ophrys, 2011
 Le mythe brisé de l'Internationale situationniste : l'aventure d'une avant-garde au cœur de la culture de masse (1945-2008) (Shattered the myth of the Situationist International: the adventure of an avant-garde at the heart of mass culture (1945-2008)), Les presses du réel, Dijon, 2007
 L'œil nomade. La photographie de voyage avec Ange Leccia (The nomad eye. Travel photography with Ange Leccia), Paris, Isthme éditions, 2005
 De la transposition. Notes sur l'écriture-cinéma de Christian Merlhiot (Transposition. Notes on writing-cinema Christian Merlhiot), Christian Merlhiot, Paris, Léo Scheer, 2003.

Filmography 
 Le désert n'a jamais tort, sur la route du Land art (The desert is never wrong, on the road to Land Art), with Fabrice Flahutez and Adeline Lausson, Paris, coproduction Galerie Vivo-equidem - Pavillon Neuflize OBC, laboratoire de création du palais de Tokyo (Palais de Tokyo creative laboratory), 30'33, 2011

References 

French art historians
21st-century French writers
French art critics
1975 births
Academic staff of Versailles Saint-Quentin-en-Yvelines University
Living people
French male non-fiction writers